Sadko is a 1953 Soviet adventure fantasy film directed by Aleksandr Ptushko and adapted by Konstantin Isayev, from Nikolai Rimsky-Korsakov's eponymous opera, which was based on a Russian bylina (epic tale) with the same name. The music is Rimsky-Korsakov's score.

The film saw release in the Soviet Union by Mosfilm in January 1953.  It was distributed in the USA by Artkino Pictures with English subtitles later in 1953, and in 1962 was English-dubbed by Roger Corman's The Filmgroup Inc. and distributed as The Magic Voyage of Sinbad.

Plot summary

This tale is based upon the legends told of ancient times in the old Russian city of Novgorod (the capital of Novgorod republic). Novgorod's merchants are feasting in a gorgeous palace. A young gusli player named Sadko is bragging that he can bring to their land a sweet-voiced bird of happiness. The merchants mock him for his bravado, and tell him his quest is impossible. Nevertheless, Sadko sets off on a travel to bring the bird of happiness to Novgorod. He is offered help by the daughter of the Ocean King - she is mesmerized by Sadko's singing and is in love with him. Sadko visits many lands in his search of the bird, including India, Egypt and other countries.  Sadko is unable to capture the bird of happiness, and returns empty handed. But on his return to Novgorod, Sadko realizes that there is no better land than his homeland, and there is no need to go far in search of one's happiness.

Cast
 Sergei Stolyarov as Sadko
 Alla Larionova as Lyubava
 Ninel Myshkova as Princess of Lake Ilmen 
 Boris Surovtsev as Ivashka the boy
 Mikhail Troyanovsky as Trifon
 Nadir Malishevsky as Vyashta the Giant
 Nikolay Kryuchkov as Omelyan Danilovich
 Ivan Pereverzev as Timofey Larionovich
 Yuri Leonidov as Kuzma Larionovich

Awards

Sadko won the "Silver Lion" award at the Venice Film Festival in 1953, and festival judges included lead actor Sergei Stolyarov in a list of the world’s best actors in the 50-year history of film.

The Magic Voyage of Sinbad
Sadko was first shown in the USA in 1953 with English subtitles, distributed by Artkino Pictures Inc.

The film was re-released in the United States in 1962 in an English-dubbed and slightly modified form by Roger Corman's Filmgroup under the title The Magic Voyage of Sinbad. It retains the plot structure of Sadko but includes several changes: the total running time is reduced from approximately 85 to 79 minutes (most of the deleted footage consists of scenes in which songs are performed, though one song is retained and sung in English), voice-over narration is added, the protagonist "Sadko" is renamed "Sinbad," and other characters and places are renamed to disguise the film's Russian origin and transform the film into a story about Sinbad the Sailor (perhaps most significantly, the city of Novgorod is renamed "Copasand"). In fact, the opening narration makes direct references to Ray Harryhausen’s 1958 hit film The 7th Voyage Of Sinbad, namely the battle with the Cyclops and the giant two-headed Roc bird, in an apparent attempt to cast this unrelated film as a direct sequel. The English dubbing in this version arguably gives the film a slightly "campier" tone than the original version, in which the dialogue has a more polished and literate tone. Cast and credits were also altered to made-up "American-sounding" names.  The "Script Adaptor" for this version of the film, uncredited, was a young Francis Ford Coppola.

This version of the film was featured in Season 5, Episode #505 of Mystery Science Theater 3000 in 1993, despite  the fact that Kevin Murphy, voice of Tom Servo, has professed a love for the "breathtaking" visual style of this and other films by Aleksandr Ptushko in multiple interviews. Paul Chaplin, another writer of the show, has also expressed admiration elsewhere, but not regrets for the mockery.

DVD release

The original Russian version of Sadko is available on DVD from RusCiCo. The English dubbed version The Magic Voyage of Sinbad is available on DVD from Retromedia, in a double-feature with The Day The Earth Froze, the English-dubbed version of Ptushko’s later fantasy epic Sampo.

The Mystery Science Theater 3000 treatment of the film's English-dubbed version was released on DVD as part of the 20th four-film box set of series episodes, through Shout! Factory on March 8, 2011. In some sets the DVD is mislabeled as the film Project Moonbase.

See also

 Sadko, the Russian bylina (epic tale) upon which the film and opera are based
 Sadko (musical tableau), a symphonic poem by Nikolai Rimsky-Korsakov.
 Sadko (opera), an opera by Rimsky-Korsakov.
 Rimsky-Korsakov is a film also from 1953 that presents fragments of the opera.

References

External links

 
 
 Sadko online at official Mosfilm site (with English subtitles)

1953 films
1950s children's fantasy films
1950s fantasy adventure films
Russian children's fantasy films
Russian epic films
Russian fantasy adventure films
Soviet epic films
Films directed by Aleksandr Ptushko
1950s Russian-language films
Films based on Slavic mythology
Films with underwater settings
Films set in India
Films set in Russia
Films shot in Moscow Oblast
Films shot in Crimea
Mosfilm films
Films based on fairy tales
Soviet children's films